Exhibition Centre railway station, previously called Finnieston (1979–1986) and Stobcross (1894–1959) due to its location in the Stobcross area of the city, is a railway station in Glasgow on the Argyle Line. It serves the OVO Hydro, the SEC Centre and the SEC Armadillo which are accessible by adjoining footbridge from an island platform. The station suffers badly from congestion at concerts as most of Greater Glasgow can be reached from the station. There is a siding adjacent to Platform 2, that can be used as a turnback siding for trains terminating at Anderston or Glasgow Central Low Level. The line is served by Class 318s and Class 320s. Ticket gates are in operation.

History 
In the days when the station was named Stobcross, the formation in front of Platform 1 was originally double track, with a platform where the overhead electrification masts are currently located. Just inside the tunnel from Partick, there was a junction.

The route, now disused, to the north went to the Glasgow Central Railway's Maryhill Central.

The route to the west is partially used by the Argyle Line link to the North Clyde Line (a new single track tunnel being constructed to connect up at Finnieston West Junction). Previously the line went to Partick Central railway station (which at one time had been renamed ) and onwards along the River Clyde to Dumbarton.

In 2017, the station's signage was changed to Craiglang, after the fictional town from the sitcom Still Game as a live version of the show was playing at the nearby OVO Hydro. Actors Ford Kiernan and Greg Hemphill provided pre-recorded safety announcements during this time. They had previously provided on-board announcements during a 2014 live-show run.

Incidents 
Heavy rain in December 1994 resulted in the River Kelvin bursting its banks at Kelvinbridge and the resultant torrent through the disused Glasgow Central Railway tunnel flooded the Argyle Line trapping Class 314 Units at Glasgow Central Low Level.

At 08:34 on Monday 3 September 2007, a set of empty coaches derailed after leaving the sidings at Exhibition Centre to start the 08:38 service from Anderston to Motherwell. This derailment resulted in two members of staff being injured and the line between Partick and Rutherglen being closed for two days.

Routes

References

Notes

Sources

External links

 Video footage of Exhibition Centre station

Former Caledonian Railway stations
Railway stations in Glasgow
Railway stations in Great Britain opened in 1894
Railway stations in Great Britain closed in 1959
Railway stations in Great Britain opened in 1979
Railway stations served by ScotRail
Reopened railway stations in Great Britain
SPT railway stations